Slepčany is a village and municipality in Zlaté Moravce District of the Nitra Region, in western-central Slovakia.

History
In historical records the village was first mentioned in 1165.

Geography
The municipality lies at an altitude of 160 metres and covers an area of 9.352 km². In 2011 it has a population of 846 inhabitants.

References

External links
Official homepage

Villages and municipalities in Zlaté Moravce District